The Rural Municipality of Sutton No. 103 is a rural municipality (RM) in the Canadian province of Saskatchewan within Census Division No. 3 and  Division No. 2.

History 
The RM of Sutton No. 103 incorporated as a rural municipality on December 11, 1911.

Geography

Communities and localities 
The following urban municipalities are surrounded by the RM.

Localities
 Ettington, dissolved as a village, December 31, 1948
 Mazenod, dissolved as a village, January 1, 2002
 Palmer, dissolved as a village, January 1, 2002
 Vantage

Demographics 

Government 
The RM of Sutton No. 103 is governed by an elected municipal council and an appointed administrator that meets on the second Thursday of every month. The reeve of the RM is David Nagel while its administrator is Jessica Green. The RM's office is located in Mossbank.

References 

Sutton

Division No. 3, Saskatchewan